Cridland is a family surname from Somerset in England. The name may refer to:

People
 John Cridland (born 1961), British businessman
 John Cridland Latham (1888–1975), American soldier and Medal of Honor recipient
 Tim Cridland, an American sideshow performer with stage name Zamora the Torture King 
 Ansel Cridland, member of The Meditations, a reggae vocal harmony group from Jamaica
 Clarissa Cridland co-operator of Girls Gone By Publishers, a publishing company based in Bath, Somerset

Other
Cridland v Federal Commissioner of Taxation (1977), Australian court case

External links 
 Cridland family-name website, with history and coat of arms

Surnames of Old English origin